Agabus biguttatus is a species of beetle belonging to the family Dytiscidae.

It is native to Europe.

References

Dytiscidae